Brian Skinner (born May 19, 1976) is an American former professional basketball player. A 6'9", 255 lb forward-center from Baylor University, Skinner was selected by the Los Angeles Clippers in the first round (22nd pick overall) of the 1998 NBA draft. He played for the Clippers, Cleveland Cavaliers, Philadelphia 76ers, Milwaukee Bucks, Sacramento Kings, Portland Trail Blazers, Phoenix Suns and Memphis Grizzlies in the NBA, as well as the Italian team Benetton Treviso.

Between his stints for the Clippers and the Cavaliers, he was traded to the Chicago Bulls and the Toronto Raptors but never played a game for either team.

He was traded from the 76ers to Sacramento in the deal that sent Kings superstar Chris Webber to Philadelphia. During his stint in Sacramento during the 2004–05 season, he had one of his best career years with a 7.4 points per game average on a 55.4 percent shooting while also grabbing 8.7 rebounds per game. He also recorded a career high of 1.7 blocks per game during that season.

In early 2006, he was traded to the Portland Trail Blazers, who then traded him in the 2006 off-season back to Milwaukee (along with Steve Blake and Ha Seung-Jin) for Jamaal Magloire.

For the 2006–07 season, Skinner averaged 4.4 points and 5.7 rebounds in 22.7 minutes per game.

Skinner and the Phoenix Suns reached an agreement on a one-year deal in September 2007.

On July 31, 2008, Skinner signed with the Clippers, his former team, and re-signed with Los Angeles again the following season. In 2010, he joined the Bucks for the third time. He was released on January 5, 2011.

In January 2011 he signed with Benetton Treviso in Italy.

In 2011, Skinner made the Memphis Grizzlies' roster after training camp, but he was waived on December 29, 2011.

Career statistics

NBA

Regular season

|-
| align="left" | 
| align="left" | L.A. Clippers
| 21 || 0 || 12.3 || .465 || – || .606 || 2.5 || .0 || .5 || .6 || 4.1
|-
| align="left" | 
| align="left" | L.A. Clippers
| 33 || 9 || 23.5 || .507 || – || .662 || 6.1 || .3 || .5 || 1.3 || 5.4
|-
| align="left" | 
| align="left" | L.A. Clippers
| 39 || 23 || 15.0 || .398 || – || .542 || 4.3 || .5 || .4 || .3 || 4.1
|-
| align="left" | 
| align="left" | Cleveland
| 65 || 8 || 17.0 || .543 || – || .608 || 4.3 || .3 || .4 || .9 || 3.4
|-
| align="left" | 
| align="left" | Philadelphia
| 77 || 9 || 17.9 || .550 || – || .602 || 4.8 || .2 || .6 || .7 || 6.0
|-
| align="left" | 
| align="left" | Milwaukee
| 56 || 54 || 28.2 || .497 || – || .572 || 7.3 || .9 || .5 || 1.1 || 10.5
|-
| align="left" | 
| align="left" | Philadelphia
| 24 || 0 || 10.3 || .386 || .000 || .294 || 2.6 || .2 || .2 || .2 || 2.0
|-
| align="left" | 
| align="left" | Sacramento
| 25 || 23 || 27.8 || .554 || – || .377 || 8.7 || 1.5 || 1.0 || 1.7 || 7.4
|-
| align="left" | 
| align="left" | Sacramento
| 38 || 0 || 11.3 || .551 || – || .444 || 2.7 || .4 || .3 || .5 || 2.3
|-
| align="left" | 
| align="left" | Portland
| 27 || 5 || 19.1 || .484 || – || .517 || 4.7 || .5 || .5 || .9 || 3.8
|-
| align="left" | 
| align="left" | Milwaukee
| 67 || 44 || 22.7 || .490 || – || .582 || 5.7 || .9 || .3 || 1.0 || 4.4
|-
| align="left" | 
| align="left" | Phoenix
| 66 || 0 || 12.8 || .465 || .667 || .524 || 3.6 || .2 || .3 || 1.2 || 3.3
|-
| align="left" | 
| align="left" | L.A. Clippers
| 51 || 21 || 16.5 || .449 || .000 || .638 || 4.0 || .5 || .3 || 1.0 || 4.2
|-
| align="left" | 
| align="left" | L.A. Clippers
| 16 || 1 || 7.7 || .400 || – || .750 || 1.7 || .0 || .2 || .2 || 1.6
|-
| align="left" | 
| align="left" | Milwaukee
| 2 || 0 || 3.0 || – || – || – || .0 || .0 || .0 || .0 || .0
|-
| align="left" | 
| align="left" | Memphis
| 1 || 0 || 4.0 || .000 || – || – || .0 || .0 || .0 || .0 || .0
|- class="sortbottom"
| style="text-align:center;" colspan="2"| Career
| 608 || 197 || 17.9 || .494 || .333 || .566 || 4.7 || .5 || .4 || .9 || 4.7

Playoffs

|-
| align="left" | 2003
| align="left" | Philadelphia
| 8 || 0 || 4.8 || .167 || .000 || 1.000 || .8 || .0 || .0 || .1 || .8
|-
| align="left" | 2004
| align="left" | Milwaukee
| 5 || 3 || 18.8 || .524 || – || .417 || 4.4 || .0 || .2 || .6 || 5.4
|-
| align="left" | 2005
| align="left" | Sacramento
| 4 || 1 || 11.8 || .500 || – || – || 2.8 || .5 || .5 || 1.0 || 2.0
|-
| align="left" | 2008
| align="left" | Phoenix
| 4 || 0 || 5.3 || .500 || – || .500 || .8 || .0 || .0 || .8 || 2.0
|- class="sortbottom"
| style="text-align:center;" colspan="2"| Career
| 21 || 4 || 9.5 || .462 || .000 || .542 || 2.0 || .1 || .1 || .5 || 2.3

Notes

External links 
NBA Profile
Benneton Basket biography (Italian)

1976 births
Living people
20th-century African-American sportspeople
21st-century African-American sportspeople
African-American basketball players
American expatriate basketball people in Italy
American men's basketball players
Basketball players from Texas
Baylor Bears men's basketball players
Centers (basketball)
Cleveland Cavaliers players
Los Angeles Clippers draft picks
Los Angeles Clippers players
Medalists at the 1997 Summer Universiade
Memphis Grizzlies players
Milwaukee Bucks players
People from Temple, Texas
Philadelphia 76ers players
Portland Trail Blazers players
Phoenix Suns players
Power forwards (basketball)
Sacramento Kings players
Universiade gold medalists for the United States
Universiade medalists in basketball